The  was a monetary unit of Japan.  The Ichibugin was worth a Quarter Ryo, and later, it was deemed that 3 could be exchanged for either a USA or Mexican Silver Dollar. The Ichibugin was made of Silver with trace amounts of gold and other elements.

Mintage

See also
 Tokugawa coinage

Notes

Coins of Japan